Goodnight Soldier  is a song written by Harry Johnson in 1943 and published by Joe Cascales Publications.

References 

Bibliography
Crew, Danny O. “Presidential Sheet Music: An Illustrated Catalogue of Published Music Associated with the American Presidency and Those Who Sought the Office”. Jefferson, North Carolina: McFarland, 2001.  

1943 songs
Songs of World War II